This is a list of notable people related to the Osmania University. Excluded from this list are those people whose only connection with Osmania is that they were awarded an honorary degree.

Arts

Business

Humanities, social science, and literature

Law

Politicians and civil servants

Science and Technology

Neelamraju Ganga Prasada Rao, plant breeder, popularly known as the Father of Hybrid Sorghum, Shanti Swarup Bhatnagar Prize recipient
Vadapalli Chandrasekhar, organometallic chemist, Shanti Swarup Bhatnagar laureate
G. Naresh Patwari, chemist and Shanti Swarup Bhatnagar laureate

Sports

Others
Mahzarin Banaji, psychologist and Richard Clarke Cabot Professor of Social Ethics at Harvard University
 Kancha Ilaiah, Dalit scholar
 K. Venkata Ramiah, founder Vice Chancellor of Kakatiya University; member of Union Public Service Commission
 G. Ram Reddy, father of Open Learning in India
 George Reddy, student leader
Ramachandru Tejavath, Retired bureaucrat and Former Principal Secretary Industries Government of Odisha, and Special Representative of Government of Telangana
 Yaga Venugopal Reddy, former Governor of the Reserve Bank of India (PhD)
 Bhukhya Chandarakala Niru,  Indian Administrative Service officer

Notable faculty

References

Notes

Citations 

Osmania University
People list